The qualification event for the 2007 World Wheelchair Curling Championship was held from November 8 to 12, 2006 at the Braehead Curling Rink in Braehead, Scotland. The event's two top finishers, Russia and Japan, both qualified to participate in the 2008 World Wheelchair Curling Championship. The two qualification spots were given to the top two teams at the conclusion of the round robin.

Teams

Round-robin standings

Round-robin results

Draw 1
Wednesday, November 8, 9:30

Draw 2
Wednesday, November 8, 14:00

Draw 3
Thursday, November 9, 9:30

Draw 4
Thursday, November 9, 14:00

Draw 5
Friday, November 10, 9:30

Draw 6
Friday, November 10, 14:00

Draw 7
Saturday, November 11, 9:30

Draw 8
Saturday, November 11, 14:00

Draw 9
Sunday, November 12, 9:30

Tiebreaker
Sunday, November 12, 14:00

External links

2006 in curling
Qualification for curling competitions
World Wheelchair Curling Championship